Collective (also known as Collective: Unravelling a Scandal) is a 2019 Romanian documentary film directed, written, produced and edited by Alexander Nanau. The film centers on the 2016 public health scandal following the Colectiv nightclub fire. The film follows dual stories of investigative journalists at the Romanian newspaper Gazeta Sporturilor uncovering public healthcare corruption and maladministration, and the government's response to the crisis at the Ministry of Health.

The film had its world premiere at the Venice Film Festival on 4 September 2019, and was released in Romania on 28 February 2020, and on 20 November 2020 in other countries, including the UK and USA. It received acclaim from critics, as well as many accolades, including from the European Film Awards and the National Society of Film Critics. It was nominated at the 93rd Academy Awards for the Best Documentary Feature and Best International Feature Film categories, becoming the first Romanian film to be nominated for an Academy Award.

Synopsis
On October 30, 2015 in Bucharest, Romania, metal band Goodbye to Gravity is performing a concert in a club called Colectiv; pyrotechnics cause a a fire to break out and quickly engulf the club, immediately killing 27 people and injuring 180. Over the following months 37 more victims die, partially due to the lack of proper healthcare at the public hospitals.

Journalists begin investigating the mismanagement of healthcare by public hospitals after sources inform them that the disinfectants used at public hospitals are diluted. Testing confirms this, and the journalists subsequently publish a hard-hitting story about the supplier, Hexi Pharma, and how it falsified the documentation for the supplied disinfectants. The story also reveals that the government failed to properly verify the supplier and its products. The Minister of Health, orders an investigation. When , a journalist from the Gazette, goes on TV to discuss the investigation, the Minister of Health dismisses the journalist's insistence for facts and evidence and states that governmental testing showed that the disinfectant solutions were 95 percent effective.

The journalists push further and find a source that confirms that the intelligence service has known for years that bacterial infections were killing people but did nothing. The Gazette publishes the story, and mass protests continue over the corruption and lack of proper healthcare protection. Consequently, the Minister of Health resigns and a criminal investigation begins against the CEO of Hexi Pharma, . The government announces at a press conference that they have tested the Hexi Pharma products and found the solutions were all diluted. Tolontan asks about the 95 percent effectiveness previously claimed by the Ministry of Health, and the Ministry responds by refusing to comment on their previous claim. Shortly after, Condrea is killed in a car crash.

Later, The Gazette obtains a video of a patient in a hospital with maggots festering in their wound. Their source, a frustrated doctor, explains that patients deaths resulting from diluted disinfectants or inadequate blood transfusion services continues unabated even after the Social Democratic governmental ousting in late 2015. Vlad Voiculescu, the new Minister of Health, meets with the doctor and she details how hospital management avoided the problems and did nothing while patients were dying. She also discusses how the hospitals treat patients inhumanely, as well as how bribes are arranged between hospital managers and doctors.

Voiculescu concludes that there isn't a single unit throughout the public hospitals that isn't affected by profound administrative corruption. He learns that he cannot fire the corrupt hospital managers currently in place, many of whom bribed their way into their positions, so he demands that extremely strict regulations for any new hospital managers are introduced. He begins to realize that the whole system is rotten and that eradicating corruption would entail "firing everyone". When he withdraws funding from a lung transplant unit, deeming it dangerous, he becomes the target of a press campaign lead by Mayor of Bucharest Gabriela Firea, who accuse him of wasting taxpayer money on transporting patients to Vienna, even though the unit in Bucharest is supposedly fully accredited to perform the same operation - a professor privately admits to Voiculescu that the unit should not have been accredited and it was done under political pressure, but begs Voiculescu not to speak about this in public in order to avoid a scandal that could ruin the reputation of the institute.

Election day arrives and the Social Democrats sweep the election, obtaining the most votes. At The Gazette, Tolontan's collague reveals she had an off-the-record conversation with someone who warns the journalists about their and their families' safety. Later on, the public hospital appoints a manager who is unqualified and legally unable to manage a hospital.

Release
The film premiered out of competition at the 76th Venice Film Festival on 4 September 2019. It was also screened at the 2019 Toronto International Film Festival and in the Spotlight section of the 2020 Sundance Film Festival. It was released in Romania on 28 February 2020, by Bad Unicorn. On 20 November 2020, it was released in the U.S. by Magnolia Pictures and Participant and in the U.K. by Dogwoof.

Reception

Critical response
The website's critics consensus reads: "Collective presents a darkly effective overview of the cycle of political corruption and public cynicism that takes hold when government abrogates its responsibility to the people." Metacritic assigned the film a weighted average score of 95 out of 100, based on 24 critics, indicating "universal acclaim".

Writing for the Los Angeles Times, Justin Chang called the film "a gripping, despairing exposé of institutional injustice". Jay Weissberg of Variety called it "a documentary for our times, deserving of widespread exposure". Manohla Dargis of New York Times wrote that the film "sketches out an honest, affecting, somewhat old-fashioned utopian example of what it takes to make the world better, or at least a little less awful."

Accolades
At the 33rd European Film Awards, the film won Best European Documentary, becoming the first ever Romanian film to achieve that feat. The film also won Best Documentary at the 41st Boston Society of Film Critics Awards. Starting off the new year on a strong foot, it went on to win the prestigious Best Foreign Language Film Award from the National Society of Film Critics on 9 January 2021. On 26 January 2021, the National Board of Review selected Collective as one of the top 5 foreign language films of the year. On 9 March 2021, the film was nominated for the 74th BAFTA Film Awards for Best Documentary. Furthermore, on 15 March 2021, the film was nominated by the Academy of Motion Picture Arts and Sciences for the 93rd Academy Awards for two categories: Best Documentary Feature and Best International Feature Film. It is only the second film to be nominated for both awards following North Macedonia's Honeyland the previous year. It is the first Romanian film to be nominated for an Academy Award, let alone in two categories. It also won the prestigious Peabody Award.

See also
 Romanian New Wave
 List of Romanian submissions for the Academy Award for Best International Feature Film
 List of submissions to the 93rd Academy Awards for Best International Feature Film
 Boston Society of Film Critics Award for Best Documentary Film
 European Film Award for Best Documentary

References

External links
 Collective – official trailer
 
 
 

Romanian documentary films
Documentary films about health care
Documentary films about journalism
Films about corruption
2019 films
Investigative journalism
2019 documentary films
Healthcare in Romania
News media in Romania
Peabody Award-winning broadcasts